The International Docking System Standard (IDSS) is an international standard for spacecraft docking adapters. It was created by the International Space Station Multilateral Coordination Board, on behalf of the International Space Station partner organizations; NASA, Roscosmos, JAXA, ESA, and the Canadian Space Agency.

The IDSS was originally formulated in 2010.  The plan is for all cooperating agencies to make their future docking systems IDSS compatible.

Design 
The IDSS docking mechanism is androgynous, uses low impact technology and allows both docking and berthing. It supports both autonomous and piloted docking and features pyrotechnics for contingency undocking. Once mated, the IDSS interface can transfer power, data, commands, air, communication, and in future implementations, will be able to transfer water, fuel, oxidizer and pressurant as well.

The IDSS has a 2-phase docking procedure consisting of a soft capture and hard capture system.

Active and passive docking roles
During a docking maneuver, one vehicle assumes the "active" role and the other vehicle assumes the "passive" role. A particular IDSS port can be designed to be able to act in the active role, the passive role, or either role. If a port (e.g., the ones on the ISS) is passive-only, then the other spacecraft must implement the active role. If a port is active-only (e.g., the ports on Crew Dragon and Cargo Dragon, and Starliner), then the other spacecraft must implement the passive role. This means that spacecraft with active-only ports cannot dock with each other using these ports.

Soft Capture System 

The soft capture system (SCS) of the active docking system is extended while the passive system remains retracted.  Each SCS consists of 3 equally spaced petals around the docking ring. As the spacecraft approach each other, the petals on the SCS align the two docking rings and the two become mechanically latched. 6 servo-actuated legs then remove any relative motion and may begin to retract. The use of the SCS allows for 6 degrees of freedom, reducing the accuracy requirement of initial docking procedures.

Hard Capture System
Once soft capture is achieved, the hard capture system (HCS) can begin final structural mating. It consists of 12 pairs of mechanical hooks on both the passive and active port. Guide pins are used to ensure accurate alignment of the docking rings to properly allow the hooks to engage. Once the hooks are fully driven, the docking ports' electrical connectors can begin transferring data and the docking procedure is complete.

Implementations 
The NASA Docking System is NASA's implementation of the IDSS. The International Docking Adapter converts older Russian APAS-95 docking systems to the International Docking System Standard. NASA set June 2016 as the starting date to construct 4 of the NASA Docking System units for the Commercial Crew Development program.[link broken] Two International Docking Adapters have been sent to the International Space Station, and another was destroyed on ascent.

The ESA's International Berthing and Docking Mechanism is their IDSS compatible docking system.

The planned Power and Propulsion Element of the Lunar Gateway will be IDSS compatible.

In March 2020, Space.com reported that a Chinese crew capsule is possibly IDSS compatible.

SpaceX designed and implemented an IDSS port for the Crew and Cargo Dragons.

References

External links 
 http://www.internationaldockingstandard.com/ (Website containing Revision E, October 2016)